Paul T. Davis (born March 25, 1947) is an American politician from Maine. He has served in both the state Senate and state House of Representatives, and is a member of the Maine Republican Party.

Prior to entering politics, Davis served for 23 years as a state trooper. He was then elected to the Maine Senate, where he served as Assistant Minority Leader and Minority Leader. He was elected to the Maine House of Representatives in 2008 and re-elected in 2010 and 2012. He is a graduate of the University of Maine.

In June 2014, after months of negative campaigning on both sides, Davis won the Republican nomination for State Senate District 4, defeating incumbent Doug Thomas, with 57% of the vote.

References

1947 births
Living people
People from Sangerville, Maine
Republican Party members of the Maine House of Representatives
Minority leaders of the Maine Senate
University of Maine alumni
People from Dexter, Maine
American state police officers
21st-century American politicians